Catasetum planiceps is a species of orchid found from North South America to Brazil.

References

planiceps
Orchids of South America
Orchids of Brazil